The Combat Service Support Battalion is a military unit of the 1st Infantry Brigade of the Estonian Land Forces. The battalion has a logistical military role and is located In Tapa, Northern Estonia.

History
The Combat Service Support Battalion is a successor to the support unit of the 1st Infantry Regiment, which was formed on 27 April 1917 and disbanded in 1940. The Combat Service Support Battalion was formed on January 1, 2009, and assigned to the 1st Infantry Brigade along with Scouts Battalion and Kalev Infantry Battalion.

Current structure
Structure as of 7 August 2013:

 Headquarters
 Combat Service Support Center
 Training Company

List of commanders
 Andres Kraav 2009 - 2010 
 Tarmo Luhaäär 2010 - 2012 
 Kalmer Kruus 2012 - 2016 
 Janek Zõbin 2016 - 2019 
 Indrek Lilleorg 2019 - 2021 
Vladislav Belov 2021 - present

See also
1st Infantry Brigade 
CSS Battalion of the 2nd Infantry Brigade
Logistics Battalion of the Support Command

References

External links
Official website of the 1st Infantry brigade, with a role of CSS Battalion
Official website 

Battalions of Estonia